Amir Emin Arli (born 5 January 2003) is a professional footballer who plays as a midfielder for Turkish TFF Second League club Kastamonuspor 1966 on loan from Samsunspor. Born in France, he is a youth international for Turkey.

Professional career
A youth product of Plastics Vallée and Jura Sud Foot, Arli joined the youth academy of Dijon in 2018. After working his way up their youth categories, Arli signed his first professional contract with the club on 17 May 2021. He made his professional debut with Dijon in a 3–0 Ligue 2 win over Nancy on 21 December 2021.

On 20 June 2022, Arli signed a three-year contract with Samsunspor in Turkey.

International career
Born in France, Arli is of Turkish descent. He represented the Turkey U16s for a pair of friendlies in February 2019.

References

External links
 
 FFF Profile

2003 births
French people of Turkish descent
People from Oyonnax
Sportspeople from Ain
Footballers from Auvergne-Rhône-Alpes
Living people
French footballers
Turkish footballers
Turkey youth international footballers
Association football midfielders
Dijon FCO players
Samsunspor footballers
Ligue 2 players
Championnat National 3 players
TFF Second League players